The 2001–02 Lega Basket Serie A, known as the Foxy Cup for sponsorship reasons, was the 80th season of the Lega Basket Serie A, the highest professional basketball league in Italy.

The regular season ran from 23 September 2001 to 27 April 2002, the playoffs ran from May 2002 to 15 June 2002.

Benetton Treviso won their 3rd title after beating Skipper Bologna 3-0 in the finals series.

Regular season

Playoffs

Bracket
{{#invoke:RoundN|main|columns=4||3rdplace=no|nowrap=yes
|skipmatch1=yes|skipmatch3=yes|skipmatch5=yes|skipmatch7=yes

|Fortitudo Bologna|-|Bye|-
||Roma|2|Roseto|0
||Cantù|-|Bye|-
||Siena|2|Udine|0
||Virtus Bologna|-|Bye|-
||Pesaro|2|Fabriano|0
||Treviso|-|Bye|-
||Trieste|2|Varese|1

||Fortitudo Bologna|3|Roma|0
||Cantù|3|Siena|0
||Virtus Bologna|3|Pesaro|0
||Treviso|3|Trieste|3

||Fortitudo Bologna|3|Cantù|2
||Virtus Bologna|1|Treviso|3

||Fortitudo Bologna|0|Treviso|3}}
Source: Sportstats.com

Results1/8 Finals Wurth Roma - Euro Roseto 2-0 (100-98, 82-70)
 Montepaschi Siena - Snaidero Udine 2-0 (100-70, 82-76)
 Scavolini Pesaro - Carifac Fabriano 2-0 (99-85, 121-66)
 Coop Nordest Trieste - Metis Varese 2-1 (97-94, 75-84, 95-84)

Bye: Skipper Bologna, Benetton Treviso, Kinder Bologna, Oregon Scientific CantùQuarterfinals Skipper Bologna - Wurth Roma 3-0 (75-65, 87-86, 100-84)
 Oregon Scientific Cantù - Montepaschi Siena 3-0 (75-68, 69-61, 77-58)
 Kinder Bologna - Scavolini Pesaro 3-0 (76-64, 82-78, 83-80)
 Benetton Treviso - Coop Nordest Trieste 3-0 (118-90, 102-85, 116-68)Semifinals Skipper Bologna - Oregon Scientific Cantù 3-2 (75-56, 69-80, 84-64, 71-76, 68-64)
 Benetton Treviso - Kinder Bologna 3-1 (97-66, 70-95, 93-83, 88-86)Finals'''
 Benetton Treviso - Skipper Bologna 3-0 (93-69, 96-85, 20-0)

Notes

References

Lega Basket Serie A seasons
1
Italy